X-Men: The End is a 2004-2006 trilogy of miniseries published by Marvel Comics, detailing the last days of the X-Men and their adventures in an alternative future. The series, which was part of Marvel's The End line of books, was written by Chris Claremont and drawn by Sean Chen, with cover art by Greg Land and Gene Ha.

The first part of the miniseries is titled Dreamers and Demons, the second Heroes and Martyrs, and the third Men and X-Men.  As it was originally conceived, several years before its actual debut, this series would have re-teamed Chris Claremont and John Byrne, with Byrne providing plots and art and Claremont providing dialogue.  Yet after a dispute with Marvel following the cancellation of Byrne's ongoing series X-Men: The Hidden Years, Byrne left the publisher.

The story of X-Men: The End continues in the 2008 GeNext mini-series, then again in the 2009 mini-series, GeNext: United.

Book 1: Dreamers and Demons
The series begins with Aliyah Bishop, an heir to the Shi'ar throne and the daughter of Lucas Bishop and Deathbird (the princess of the Shi'ar Empire and sister to Lilandra), in her sentient ship, the Starjammer (which is inhabited by the spirit of Carol Danvers). Aliyah is flying through space when she witnesses a Kree dreadnought entering orbit around a planet. Deciding to investigate, she lands on the planet to discover that a coalition of Slavers (multi-dimensional traders of everything) have brokered a deal with the Kree for the Phoenix Egg which the Kree hope to use against the Shi'ar. Realizing the danger to her people, Aliyah knows that she must warn the Shi'ar, but she is attacked by the Slavers' brainwashed mutant bodyguards, the Hounds. Just as that happens, Shi'ar warships appear in space and start attacking the Kree ship in orbit. The Kree on the planet attempt to flee, when it is revealed that one of their troops is a Skrull agent who proceeds to destroy the Kree landing-transport. As the Slavers' decide to make a hasty retreat through their interdimensional portal, Brood eggs begin to land and hatch on the planet, killing any remaining Kree troops and going after Aliyah. Meanwhile, the Phoenix Egg hatches, revealing Jean Grey, the previous bearer of the Phoenix Force. Jean Grey helps Aliyah escape onto her ship, saving Nightcrawler's enslaved alternate reality daughter, Nocturne. Both the Shi'ar and the Brood are apparently after a new stargate network.

Aliyah engages her ship to warp speed inside the planet's atmosphere, which destroys the planet, as well as its star and all ships in orbit. Jean Grey saves the Starjammer by manifesting the Phoenix Force. This discharge is noted by several parties: Scott and Emma Summers, their four children; Rachel Grey, campaign manager for Kitty Pryde's Chicago mayoral election campaign; Professor X; Cable; Wolverine and Storm, living in a house in Kenya; and Mister Sinister who notes that all the pieces are finally back on the board to allow him to restart his plans for world domination.

It is revealed that Sinister had himself made a deal with the Slavers for the Phoenix Egg, and he becomes rather upset at the Slavers' representative for forgetting all the help he had given them with genetic samples of mutants (including the X-Men). Sinister sends his minions (Shaitan, Divinity, TechnarX, Shakti, and Scalphunter) to kill most X-Force members, including Cable — seemingly succeeding in killing all but a few (Feral, Rictor, and Domino survive). Cable is infected with a techno-organic virus (via TechnarX).

Shi'ar Empress Lilandra Neramani orders Phoenix destroyed once more. Her Lord Chancellor makes his own plans and orders the X-Men killed. He sends shapeshifting Warskrulls to Earth. Warskrulls attack every X-Man on Earth, including Storm and Wolverine in Africa, Emma Frost and Rogue in California, and Iceman and Sage at X-Corp headquarters. Emma and Rogue survive only to realize that Rogue's home has been attacked and both Emma's (and Scott's) and Rogue's (and Gambit's) children have been taken, apparently, by Mister Sinister, with Gambit seemingly betraying his wife and team to deliver the children to Sinister in person.

The first series ends with an attack on the Xavier Institute by Stryfe, Genesis, and Madelyne Pryor, all of whom turn out to be Warskrulls (except, as revealed only in Book 3, Madelyne). As the X-Men at Xavier's try to defend themselves, the deaths of many students and staff ensue. The mansion is once again destroyed with an explosion so large that it takes a large area of the landscape and all of the mansion's lower levels with it. Only a few students and X-Men escape.

Book 2: Heroes and Martyrs

The story begins at the ruins of the Xavier institute. Where the estate once resided, it has been replaced with a mile-wide crater. Northstar, having saved Cyclops, dies from internal injuries. It is revealed that he joins the rest of the original Alpha Flight in the hereafter. Kitty Pryde returns to Chicago, to continue her campaign for mayor. The X-Men and their allies quickly regroup, but they almost immediately all come under attack by the next wave of War Skrulls. During the strategic attack on all of the various groups across the globe, the Skrulls are barely repelled while the X-Men experience heavy losses.

It is revealed that Sinister wants Rogue's and Emma's children as genetic stock for the future, since he has concluded the X-Men are hopeless.

In space Nocturne is cured by Phoenix with the help of Nightcrawler, whom she brought aboard the Starjammer in the first book.  It is revealed, in the process of freeing Nocturne's mind, that Lilandra (by brokering a deal with the Slavers for a Brood queen from a dimension where the Brood were not extinct) is responsible for the Brood returning to this dimension. Lilandra was able to accomplish this, in part, by allowing her captured sister to act as the host for the Brood Queen. Both Lilandra and the Slavers made this arrangement in order to defeat Khan (see X-Treme X-Men) (who threatened Lilandra's throne and Slavers' trade routes in this dimension). Aliyah learns of this the hard way by wandering into a dark (i.e., depowered) section of her ship and being attacked by Deathbird/Brood queen (who was stowed away on the ship for years). In the resulting battle, Aliyah is forced to kill her mother (but not before Aliyah is infected by the Brood Queen, something that no one on board the ship notices when she returns to the bridge).

Cyclops sends Wolverine, X-23, M, and Marvel Girl to find Sinister, Gambit, and the abducted children. The heroes manage to find their way to Sinister's hidden base but are immediately immobilized by an attack from Lady Mastermind.  All live out their fantasies until Wolverine, who is inspired by the astral form of Jean Grey to fight, does so. He breaks free of the mind control and helps the others break free. They all charge deeper into Sinister's base.

Gambit has indeed been faking cooperation with Sinister, only doing so in order to protect the children. After Sinister reveals his own history and the fact that Gambit is actually a clone from his and Cyclops's genetic makeup, Gambit decides enough is enough and goes to rescue the children. As they make their escape, most of the children are teleported back to Earth, while Gambit and his daughter are teleported to the moon, near Sinister's mutant prison Neverland. Rogue rescues her son and Emma's children from they were teleported.

Back at Sinister's base, Rogue has joined the fray (caused by Wolverine and others) and kills one of Sinister's minions.  Before she can rejoin her loved ones, she is slain by Sinister who was masquerading as Gambit. Gambit is able to use the portal to get back to Sinister's base just in time to see Sinister killing Rogue. They say their final farewells before Rogue dies. Mystique arrives, revealing that she had been pretending to be Dark Beast (who was in service of Sinister) all along, and she exacts her revenge for the loss of her foster daughter Rogue by killing Sinister. Gambit urges Mystique to finally meet her grandchildren and keep them safe. Gambit takes Sinister's place for a meeting with the true mastermind behind the attacks on the X-Men, the Shi'ar.

Book 2 comes to a close with Kitty debating her opponent Alice Tremaine (head of the anti-mutant Purity Movement) and receiving the news that the X-Men are going into space to face the Shi'ar.

Book 3: Men and X-Men

X-Men (including Professor X and Magneto, in person) take the battle to the Shi'ar. It is revealed that Khan is Lord Chancellor of the Shi'Ar empire, i.e., the administrator of law, with Lilandra being just the figurehead after being driven insane by Cassandra Nova. It was his plan to destroy the X-Men and kill Lilandra to get the Shi'ar throne. Gambit, however, instantly recognizes Khan - they battle and end up killing each other.

As the X-Men (Cyclops, X-23, M, Captain Britain, and a few others arriving through the wormhole created by Magneto and his daughter, Lorna) begin to battle Lilandra's guard on Chandilar (the Imperial Shi'ar throneworld), the Starjammer arrives in orbit. Storm, Iceman, and a few others form a Plan B contingent and fly to Chandilar in an X-Jet via a space portal.

It is revealed that Cassandra Nova is the mastermind behind everything. She has been hiding in Xavi, the son of Lilandra and Xavier, all this time. She begins to reveal herself to everyone involved, starting with Xavier (who, thinking she was inhabiting Lilandra, mistakenly kills her). On the Starjammer, the Brood eggs have multiplied thanks to Aliyah and have begun landing on the Shi'ar's home planet. Also, Cassandra reveals herself to the Phoenix through Aliyah's mind. The Brood, having made a deal with Cassandra, begin attacking X-Men.

Cassandra Nova attacks the X-Men and the Shi'ar Imperial Guard. She then begins to erase Xavier's mind. Marvel Girl summons her residual Phoenix Force energies and engages Cassandra in psychic battle. Meanwhile, Cable uses his vast telekinetic powers to fight Cassandra on the physical level, but succumbs to his techno-organic virus he was infected with as a baby and re-infected with in book one.

Jean Grey, once again the Phoenix, uses her powers to heal Cable, when, suddenly, she (and Cyclops) are killed by a psionic blast fired by a mind-controlled Marvel Girl. Cassandra's astral form leaps out of Marvel Girl's mind, and merges with the Phoenix Force. Cassandra begins killing the Imperial Guard, and Dazzler fires a laser beam through Cassandra's forehead, burning a hole in it, while Storm and Iceman hit her with their elemental powers. However, Cassandra rises from defeat and, in a form of divine punishment, blows a hole through Dazzler and turns Iceman's and Storm's powers against them, killing Storm as well. Only Madelyne Pryor, who has been impersonating Dust (thanks to her black niqāb) all along, after killing her in Book 1, stands in her way. Madelyne reveals that she is the part of Jean Grey that loved Scott with all her heart, and that was the reason that Cyclops' and Jean's marriage failed. Madelyne turns into energy and fuses with Jean Grey, who awakens and heals Cyclops.

As Jean Grey (still able to access some of her Phoenix powers) and Nova fight, Psylocke enters the fray and plunges her psi-katana in Cassandra's brain, immobilizing her. Jean Grey tells Cassandra that they are all going to transcend reality. Jean resurrects all of the defeated/dead X-Men, bringing some with her to become one with the universe while bringing others back to Earth. Xavier and Cassandra admit that they are scared of each other, and Jean tells them that this is part of being human. Then, she and the resurrected X-Men form a giant Phoenix and become part of the universe itself.

The remaining X-Men not part of the Phoenix are seen 20 years later, when Katherine Pryde becomes President of the United States. It is revealed that she not only became Mayor, but a Governor as well. Alice Tremaine arrives in the Oval Office and makes peace with Kitty, admitting she was wrong about her and about mutantkind. Kitty formally disbands the X-Men, saying that they were their own worst enemy, and that it was time for something new. She emphasizes this is not an end, but a beginning.

In the final frames as Kitty makes a speech, Wolverine is shown together with Psylocke, and X-23 behind him. Emma Frost is shown with her grown up children. Mystique is shown with her two grandchildren, Gambit's son is holding a baby. Beast is shown with Cecilia Reyes and their three children. Iceman and Magma are shown together. Sam Guthrie (Cannonball) is shown with his wife, Lila Cheney, and their trio of children. Kurt Wagner, Nightcrawler, is shown with his wife and two children. Aliya Bishop, now the Majestrix of the Shi'Ar is shown with her father, Lucas Bishop, now an Imperial Chancellor. Jean Grey (Phoenix), Marvel Girl, Gambit and Rogue, Havok and Lorna, Alpha Flight, Professor X and Cassandra, Storm, Archangel with Husk, Cyclops, Madelyne, Dust, Cable, Lilandra, Sage, Colossus, Hub, and a few others are shown above the crowd looking down from the other side, as it were.

Events

Family relations
The following have occurred within this continuity of the X-Men:

 Scott Summers and Emma Frost are married and have four children (a daughter Megan, an infant son Alex, and twin daughters)
 Remy LeBeau and Anna Raven (Rogue) are married with a son and daughter, Olivier and Becca.
 Beast is married to Cecilia Reyes. They have three children (2 boys and 1 girl). Ciaran, Francesca and Miguel McCoy.
 Nightcrawler is retired and married to Kymri Wagner (a woman who resembles him, whom he met during the first Excalibur series).  They have two children: TJ Wagner (a boy) and Cerise Wagner (a girl). Talia Josephine Wagner (Nocturne of the Exiles) is a member of their family as well.
 Professor X is seen to have sired a child with Lilandra Neramani, a son and heir to the Shi'ar throne, but was not told of this. The child's name is Xavi.
 Bishop and Deathbird have a daughter, Aliyah Bishop, of whom Bishop is unaware.
 Sam Guthrie and Lila Cheney appear to be a couple (although Lila retains her last name).  They have three children: Thomas Jefferson Guthrie, Nina Susan and Danielle Paige Cheney.
 Katherine "Kitty" Pryde has three children: Meredith (the eldest), Doug, and Sara. According to Chris Claremont, Kitty's children are hers, (by some unexplained mechanism), with Rachel Grey.

Revelations
 Carol Danvers is a being of pure energy now and in control of the Starjammer.
 Beast has reverted to his more human-looking beast form.
 Jubilee has retired from her life as an X-Men and become a director. She directed a mutant version of a James Bond film, starring Nightcrawler.
 Nocturne, Madrox, & Siryn have been turned into mutant-hunting hounds. Slipstream works freely with the slavers.
 Rogue did not kill Vargas (in X-treme X-Men) and he is now head of the X.S.E.
 Rogue can now touch people without absorbing their psyches & powers.
 Danielle Moonstar dies only to be resurrected by Hela as a Valkyrie.
 The Neverland Concentration Camp has been moved to the blue area of the moon.
 Gambit is revealed to be a clone of Mr. Sinister. He is also shown to have the DNA of Scott Summers (DNA to give him mutant abilities) spliced in with his original unaltered human DNA, making him the clone son of one of the X-Men's most persistent enemies (and genetic brother of Scott and Alex Summers).

Death toll
 Alex Summers & Annie Ghazikhanian: Killed prior to the series (revealed in Bk 1)
 Carol Danvers: Turned to energy prior to series (resembling her previous Binary form)
 Siryn: Book 1 #1
 Multiple Man: Book 1 #1
 Cerise: Book 1 #3
 Puffball:Book 1 #3
 Meltdown: Book 1 #4
 Warpath: Book 1 #4
 Shatterstar: Book 1 #4
 Apocalypse: Book 1 #4
 Irene Merryweather: Book 1 #4
 Valerie Cooper: Book 1 #5
 Prodigy: Book 1 #5
 Carter Ghazikhanian: Book 1 #6
 Dust: Book 1 #6
 Juggernaut: 1 #6
 Rahne Sinclair: Book 1 #6
 Northstar: Book 2 #1
 Aurora, Sasquatch, Puck & Shaman: Died prior to the series (revealed in Book 2 #1)
 Domino: Book 2 #1
 Feral: Book 2 #1
 Rictor: Book 2 #1
 Callisto: Book 2 #2
 Banshee (Was revealed to be a Warskrull in disguise): Book 2 #2
 Lifeguard: Killed prior to the series (recapped in Book 2 #3)
 Deathbird: Book 2 #3
 Danielle Moonstar: Book 2 #4 (reborn as a Valkyrie)
 Technarx: Book 2 #6
 Shaitan: Book 2 #6
 Rogue: Book 2 #6
 Quicksilver & Scarlet Witch: Killed prior to the series (confirmed in Book 3 #5)
 Hub: Book 3 #2
 Polaris: Book 3 #2
 Gambit: Book 3 #3
 Archangel: Book 3 #3
 Carol Danvers: Book 3 #4
 Professor X: Book 3 #6
 Magneto: Book 3 #6
 Captain Britain: Book 3 #6
 Jean Grey: Book 3 #6
 Madelyne Pryor: Book 3 #6 (Merged with Jean Grey)
 Cyclops: Book 3 #6
 Storm: Book 3 #6
 Dazzler: Book 3 #6
 Sage: Book 3 #6
 Cable: Book 3 #6
 Rachel Grey: Book 3 #6

Criticism
W. Blaine Dowler of Bureau 42 gave X-Men: The End Book 1: Dreamers and Demons a 21 out of a possible 42. Dowler praised the scenes featuring Storm as the most compelling, despite not having been a particularly avid fan of that character, and the artwork, saying that the pencils, coloring and storytelling were "all on target", but criticized other aspects of the book, including the characterization, the pacing of the action scenes, and the story, which he felt was neither original nor complete, lacked character insight, and did not serve as a worthy finale to the X-Men.

GeNext
According to one interview with Chris Claremont, GeNext is supposed to take place 10 years after the events of X-Men: The End, although as the series progresses, several characters who have died in X-Men: The End are revealed to still be alive, such as Cyclops and Gambit. GeNext was planned as a five-issue miniseries, with a sequel mini-series published in 2009.

The storyline was originally conceived with the idea of the X-Men aging in real-time. In an early 2006 interview with IGN, Chris Claremont summarized the concept as:

Some 1990s characters appeared, such as Stryfe and Cecilia Reyes, both of whom appeared in X-Men: The End. In the February 2006 IGN interview, Claremont also mentioned that Xavier and Magneto were both alive, contrary to the X-Men: The End storyline, though he stated in a May 2008 Newsarama interview that "Charlie has moved on and so has Magneto. They've died over the last twenty years".

Cyclops and Gambit, who both died at the end of the X-Men: The End storyline, are shown to be alive in this future, with Cyclops still running the school with Emma Frost, though both fell out of touch with the X-Men after Rogue's death, as Gambit barely speaks to his son Olivier, doing so only through Olivier's sister.

Characters
 Becca Munroe: Daughter of Storm. Father unknown.
 Rico Richards (led to believe to be the grandson of Reed Richards and Susan Richards): Alleged son of Franklin Richards.
 Olivier Raven: Son of Rogue and Gambit. Oldest child of Rogue and Gambit. Took his mother's maiden name presumably after her death and his estrangement from his father.
 Rebecca LeBeau: Daughter of Rogue and Gambit.
 Pavel Rasputin: Grandson of Colossus. Son of Kid Colossus and (the much older) Polaris.
 Beast
 Cecilia Reyes
 X-23
 Emma Frost
 Cyclops
 Megan Summers: Daughter of Cyclops and Emma Frost.

References

External links
Review of Book One, Bureau 42
X-Men: The End (Book One), Grand Comics Database
X-Men: The End - Heroes and Martyrs (Book Two), Grand Comics Database
X-Men: The End (Book Three), Grand Comics Database

2004 comics debuts
2006 comics endings
Comics by Chris Claremont
The End (comics) titles